The girls' 5,000 metres walk event at the 2010 Youth Olympic Games was held on 21 August 2010 in Bishan Stadium.

Schedule

Results

Final

Intermediate times:

External links
 iaaf.org - Women's 5km walk
 

Athletics at the 2010 Summer Youth Olympics